Loughgall is a small village, townland (of 131 acres) and civil parish in County Armagh, Northern Ireland. It is in the historic baronies of Armagh and Oneilland West. It had a population of 282 people (116 households) in the 2011 Census. Loughgall was named after a small nearby loch. The village is surrounded by orchards.

History 
In the Middle Ages the chiefs of the Uí Nialláin, a Gaelic clan, resided at Loughgall crannog, a fortified lake dwelling. By the 16th century the O'Neills of Tír Eoghain had taken over the area, and the crannog became the residence of the O'Neill chief's brother or eldest son.

In the early 1600s, the area was settled by English and Scottish Protestants as part of the Ulster Plantation. During the 1641 Irish Rebellion, settlers were held at a prison camp at Loughgall by Catholic rebels led by Manus O'Cane.

In 1795, rival sectarian gangs, the Catholic Defenders and Protestant Peep-o'-Day Boys fought a bloody skirmish near the village, called the Battle of the Diamond, that left around 30 people dead. Following this, the Protestant Orange Order was founded in Dan Winter's House nearby.

On 8 May 1987, eight members of the Provisional IRA East Tyrone Brigade launched a bomb and gun attack on the village's Royal Ulster Constabulary (RUC) station but were intercepted by a Special Air Service (SAS) unit of twenty-four soldiers who were aware of the planned attack. The SAS shot dead all of the IRA attackers and a passing civilian who had unwittingly drove into the ambush and was mistaken for an IRA member. The incident is known as the Loughgall ambush. For more information see The Troubles in Loughgall, which includes a list of incidents in Loughgall during the Troubles that resulted in two or more fatalities.

Sport 
It is home to Loughgall Football Club, which plays in the IFA Championship.

Education 
The Cope Primary School
There was also a Roman Catholic primary school located on the Eagralougher Road, just outside Loughgall, but due to lack of funding and low enrolment figures the school closed in June 1996.

People
Poet W. R. Rodgers (1909 – 1969). He later gave up the ministry and became a BBC radio producer and scriptwriter. He died in California in 1969 and was buried in Loughgall.
Cope family; MPs Robert Cope and Robert Camden Cope; and Anthony Cope (Dean of Armagh)

Civil parish of Loughgall
The civil parish contains the villages of Annaghmore, Charlemont and Loughgall.

The civil parish contains the following townlands:

Aghinlig
Altaturk
Annaghmacmanus
Annaghmore
Annasamry
Ardress East, Ardress West
Ballygasey
Ballymagerny
Ballytyrone
Borough of Charlemont
Causanagh
Clonmain
Cloven Eden
Coragh
Corr and Dunavally
Derrycoose
Derrycrew
Drumart
Drumharriff
Drumilly
Drumnasoo
Dunavally and Corr
Eagralougher
Fernagreevagh
Keenaghan
Kinnegoe
Kishaboy
Legavilly
Levalleglish
Lislasly
Lisneany
Lissheffield
Loughgall
Mullaghbane
Mullaghmore
Mullanasilla
Rathdrumgran
Tirmacrannon
Turcarra

See also 
Market houses in Northern Ireland
List of civil parishes of County Armagh
List of townlands in County Armagh

References

External links 
Discover Northern Ireland
NI Horticulture & Plant Breeding Station
NI Conflict Archive on the Internet
Culture Northern Ireland
Loughgall Market House
Loughgall Presbyterian Church

 
Townlands of County Armagh
Villages in County Armagh